Bonfilsia tricolor is a species of beetle in the family Cerambycidae. It was described by Villiers in 1979.

References

Tillomorphini
Beetles described in 1979